Mohammad Hossein Akbari (born 1950) is a former tennis player from Iran.

Career
He was introduced to Tennis at age of 6. His first Tennis competitive match was in 1961 where he defeated Iran's runner up Nemat Nemati. At age of 16 he became the first Iranian to compete at 1966 Wimbledon Juniors. In 1967 he competed at the Orange Bowl. He was Iran's champion in 1973, 1974 and 1979.

From 1967 to 1978, Akbari took part in Davis Cup campaigns for Iran.

Akbari competed in the 1969 French Open played in both Men's singles and Men's doubles and lost in the opening round. In Men's doubles he partnered his brother Taghi Akbari.

He was coach of Iran's tennis team seniors as well as Juniors from 1993 to 1994.

His highest singles rank was 318 (20 December 1974).

References

External links
 

Iranian male tennis players
Living people
1950 births
Sportspeople from Tehran